Gunnar Nilsson (1948–1978) was a Swedish racing driver.

Gunnar Nilsson may also refer to:

 Gunnar Nilsson (athlete) (1889–1948), Swedish Olympic athlete
 Gunnar Nilsson (boxer) (1923–2005), Swedish boxer who competed in the 1948 Summer Olympics
 Gunnar Nilsson (trade unionist) (1922–1997), Swedish trade union organizer

See also
 Gunnar Nielsen (disambiguation)
 Gunnar Nelson (disambiguation)